Camargoia is a genus of bees belonging to the family Apidae.

The species of this genus are found in Southern America.

Species:

Camargoia camargoi 
Camargoia nordestina 
Camargoia pilicornis

References

Apidae